The women's football tournament at the 2020 Summer Olympics in Tokyo, Japan was held from 21 July to 6 August 2021. The women's tournament is a full international tournament with no restrictions on age. The twelve national teams involved in the tournament were required to register a squad of 18 players, including two goalkeepers. Additionally, teams could name a maximum of four alternate players, numbered from 19 to 22. The alternate list could contain at most three outfielders, as at least one slot was reserved for a goalkeeper. In the event of serious injury during the tournament, an injured player would be able to be replaced by one of the players in the alternate list. Only players in these squads were planned to be eligible to take part in the tournament. On 2 July, FIFA confirmed that there was a change for the 2020 Olympics, allowing all 22 players named to be available on the roster, with 18 being named for each match. This change was implemented due to the challenges of the COVID-19 pandemic. The official squad lists were released by FIFA on 7 July 2021, with the athletes originally named as alternates assigned the numbers 19 through 22. The IOC also confirmed that a player must appear on at least one 18-player matchday roster to be considered an Olympian and to receive a medal.

The position listed for each player is per the official squad lists published by FIFA. The age listed for each player is on 21 July 2021, the first day of the tournament. The numbers of caps and goals listed for each player do not include any matches played after the start of the tournament. The club listed is the club for which the player last played a competitive match prior to the tournament. The nationality for each club reflects the national association (not the league) to which the club is affiliated. A flag is included for coaches who are of a different nationality than their own national team.

Group E

Canada
The final squad of 18 athletes and four alternates was announced on June 23, 2021. Those listed with numbers 19 to 22 were the alternates.

Head coach:  Bev Priestman

Chile
The final squad of 22 athletes was announced on 2 July 2021.

Head coach: José Letelier

Great Britain
The final squad of 22 athletes was originally announced on 27 May 2021. Before the tournament, Carly Telford replaced the injured Karen Bardsley on 18 June 2021. 

Head coach:  Hege Riise

Japan
The final squad of 22 athletes was announced on 18 June 2021.

Head coach: Asako Takakura

Group F

Brazil
The final squad of 22 athletes was announced on 18 June 2021. On 2 July 2021, Adriana withdrew from the squad due to injury and was replaced by Angelina.

Head coach:  Pia Sundhage

China PR

A provisional squad of 26 athletes was named on 8 June 2021. The final squad of 22 athletes was announced on 7 July 2021. On 9 July 2021, Chen Qiaozhu replaced Jin Kun.

Head coach: Jia Xiuquan

Netherlands
The final squad of 22 athletes was announced on 16 June 2021. On 20 July 2021, Joëlle Smits replaced Sherida Spitse due to injury.

Head coach: Sarina Wiegman

Zambia
The following 22 athletes were named on 2 July 2021.

Head coach: Bruce Mwape

Group G

Australia
The following 22 athletes were named on 30 June 2021.

Head coach:  Tony Gustavsson

New Zealand
The final squad of 22 athletes was announced on 25 June 2021.

Head coach:  Tom Sermanni

Sweden
The final squad of 22 athletes was announced on 29 June 2021.

Head coach: Peter Gerhardsson

United States
The final squad of 22 was announced on 23 June 2021.

Head coach:  Vlatko Andonovski

References

External links
Women's Olympic Football Tournament Tokyo 2020, FIFA.com

Squads
2020
Football Women's